is a Japanese mixed martial artist and former King of Pancrase Featherweight Champion. He is also the former King of the Cage Lightweight Champion.

"Takumi"(タクミ, all katakana) ring name of Nakayama in Japan.

Biography 
Nakayama was in second place of the Japanese Amateur Shooto Championship Welterweight in 1999 and in second place of the Japanese Combat Wrestling 69 kg weight class in 1999.

King of the Cage
Nakayama beat Charlie Kohler (USA) in KOTC 43 on November 14, 2004, and became the King of the Cage Lightweight Champion. He then lost his title to Mac Danzig on Oct 29th, 2005 in Reno, Nevada when his corner threw in the towel after he received over 20 unanswered strikes.

Pancrase
In April 2011, Nakayama cut down to the Featherweight division, and won by rear-naked choke submission against Yusuke Kawanago in Pancrase. He became the Pancrase Interim Featherweight Champion by unanimous decision, defeating Tomonari Kanomata on September 4, 2011.

On June 2, 2012, Nakayama fight the Pancrase Interim Featherweight Championship, challenger Jon Shores, who was on a 10-fight winning streak. He was knocked down many times in the punch of the shores. However, he won via rear-naked choke submission in the third round.

On August 9, 2012, Marlon Sandro vacated the Pancrase Featherweight Championship. Nakayama has been moved to its title from Pancrase Interim Featherweight Championship.

Championships and accomplishments

Mixed martial arts
King of the Cage
KOTC Lightweight Championship (1 Time)
Pancrase
Featherweight King of Pancrase (1 Time)
Interim Featherweight King of Pancrase (1 Time)
One successful title defense

Mixed martial arts record

|-
| Loss
| align=center| 19–16–6 (1)
| Issei Tamura
| Decision (unanimous)
|  Pancrase: 273
| 
| align=center| 3
| align=center| 5:00
| Tokyo, Japan
| 
|-
| Loss
| align=center| 19–15–6 (1)
| Nam Phan
| Decision (split)
| Pancrase 264
| 
| align=center| 3
| align=center| 5:00
| Tokyo, Japan
|| 
|-
| Win
| align=center| 19–14–6 (1)
| Wataru Miki
| Submission (rear-naked choke)
| Vale Tudo Japan: VTJ 5th in Osaka
| 
| align=center| 2
| align=center| 2:29
| Osaka, Japan
|
|-
| Loss
| align=center| 18–14–6 (1)
| Will Chope
| TKO (punches)
| PXC: Pacific Xtreme Combat 40 
| 
| align=center| 3
| align=center| 1:42
| Mangilao, Guam
|
|-
| Win
| align=center| 18–13–6 (1)
| Johnny Pecyna
| Submission (kimura)
| PXC: Pacific Xtreme Combat 37
| 
| align=center| 1
| align=center| N/A
| Pasig, Philippines 
|
|- 
| Draw
| align=center| 17–13–6 (1)
| Koji Oishi
| Draw (majority)
| Pancrase: 246
| 
| align=center| 3
| align=center| 5:00
| Tokyo, Japan
|
|-
| Win
| align=center| 17–13–5 (1)
| Jon Shores
| Submission (rear-naked choke)
| Pancrase: Progress Tour 7
| 
| align=center| 3
| align=center| 2:47
| Tokyo, Japan
| 
|-
| Win
| align=center| 16–13–5 (1)
| Tomonari Kanomata
| Decision (unanimous)
| Pancrase: Impressive Tour 9
| 
| align=center| 3
| align=center| 5:00
| Tokyo, Japan
| 
|-
| Draw
| align=center| 15–13–5 (1)
| Kenichi Ito 
| Draw
| Zst: Zst 28
| 
| align=center| 2
| align=center| 5:00
| Tokyo, Japan
| 
|-
| Win
| align=center| 15–13–4 (1)
| Yusuke Kawanago
| Submission (rear-naked choke)
|Pancrase: Impressive Tour 3
| 
| align=center| 1
| align=center| 3:27
| Tokyo, Japan
| 
|-
| Win
| align=center| 14–13–4 (1)
| Tsuneo Kimura
| Decision (unanimous)
| Shooto: Border: Season 2 - Immovable
| 
| align=center| 2
| align=center| 5:00
| Osaka, Japan
| 
|-
| Loss
| align=center| 13–13–4 (1)
| Shinji Sasaki
| TKO (punches)
| Shooto: Gig West 12
| 
| align=center| 1
| align=center| 3:51
| Osaka, Japan
| 
|-
| Loss
| align=center| 13–12–4 (1)
| Dominique Robinson
| Decision (unanimous)
| PFC 11: All In
| 
| align=center| 3
| align=center| 3:00
| Tokyo, Japan
| 
|-
| Loss
| align=center| 13–11–4 (1)
| Eiji Mitsuoka
| TKO (punches)
| GCM: Cage Force 3
| 
| align=center| 1
| align=center| 3:30
| Tokyo, Japan
| 
|-
| NC
| align=center| 13–10–4 (1)
| Anthony McDavitt
| No Contest
| No Limits: Proving Ground
| 
| align=center| 1
| align=center| N/A
| Irvine, California, United States
| 
|-
| Win
| align=center| 13–10–4
| Yoichi Fukumoto
| Decision (unanimous)
| GCM: Cage Force EX Western Bound
| 
| align=center| 3
| align=center| 5:00
| Tottori, Japan
| 
|-
| Draw
| align=center| 12–10–4
| Wataru Takahashi
| Draw
| GCM: Cage Force 1
| 
| align=center| 2
| align=center| 5:00
| Tokyo, Japan
| 
|-
| Loss
| align=center| 12–10–3
| Kenji Arai
| KO (punch)
| MARS 
| 
| align=center| 2
| align=center| 0:04
| Tokyo, Japan
| 
|-
| Loss
| align=center| 12–9–3
| Mac Danzig
| TKO (cut)
| KOTC: Execution Day
| 
| align=center| 3
| align=center| 2:45
| Reno, Nevada, United States
| 
|-
| Loss
| align=center| 12–8–3
| Hiroki Nagaoka
| Decision (majority)
| Deep: 19th Impact
| 
| align=center| 2
| align=center| 5:00
| Tokyo, Japan
| 
|-
| Loss
| align=center| 12–7–3
| Ganjo Tentsuku
| Decision (unanimous)
| Shooto: 1/29 in Korakuen Hall
| 
| align=center| 3
| align=center| 5:00
| Tokyo, Japan
| 
|-
| Win
| align=center| 12–6–3
| Charlie Kohler
| TKO (punches)
| KOTC 44: Revenge
| 
| align=center| 2
| align=center| 2:35
| San Jacinto, California, United States
|  
|-
| Win
| align=center| 11–6–3
| Charles Bennett
| Submission (rear-naked choke)
| KOTC 39: Hitmaster
| 
| align=center| 1
| align=center| 2:46
| San Jacinto, California, United States
| 
|-
| Loss
| align=center| 10–6–3
| Ryan Bow
| Decision (majority)
| Shooto: 7/16 in Korakuen Hall
| 
| align=center| 3
| align=center| 5:00
| Tokyo, Japan 
| 
|-
| Win
| align=center| 10–5–3
| Takashi Nakakura
| Decision (unanimous)
| Shooto 2004: 4/11 in Osaka Prefectural Gymnasium
| 
| align=center| 3
| align=center| 5:00
| Osaka, Japan
| 
|-
| Loss
| align=center| 9–5–3
| Marcus Aurélio
| Submission (armbar)
| ZST
| 
| align=center| 1
| align=center| 3:05
| Tokyo, Japan
| 
|-
| Loss
| align=center| 9–4–3
| Tatsuya Kawajiri
| TKO (punches)
| Shooto - Shooter's Dream 2
| 
| align=center| 1
| align=center| 3:44
| Tokyo, Japan
| 
|-
| Loss
| align=center| 9–3–3
| Joachim Hansen
| Decision (majority)
| Shooto: Year End Show 2002
| 
| align=center| 3
| align=center| 5:00
| Tokyo, Japan
| 
|-
| Draw
| align=center| 9–2–3
| Rumina Sato
| Draw
| Shooto: Treasure Hunt 11
| 
| align=center| 3
| align=center| 5:00
| Tokyo, Japan
| 
|-
| Win
| align=center| 9–2–2
| Takeshi Yamazaki
| Decision (unanimous)
| Shooto: Gig East 10
| 
| align=center| 3
| align=center| 5:00
| Tokyo, Japan
| 
|-
| Loss
| align=center| 8–2–2
| Vítor Ribeiro
| Submission (arm-triangle choke)
| HOOKnSHOOT: Relentless
| 
| align=center| 1
| align=center| 0:51
| Evansville, Indiana, United States
| 
|-
| Loss
| align=center| 8–1–2
| Marcio Barbosa
| TKO (guillotine choke)
| Shooto: To The Top Final Act
| 
| align=center| 1
| align=center| 0:32
| Tokyo, Japan
| 
|-
| Win
| align=center| 8–0–2
| Henry Matamoros
| Submission (exhaustion)
| HOOKnSHOOT: Kings 1
| 
| align=center| 3
| align=center| 3:30
| Evansville, Indiana, United States
| 
|-
| Win
| align=center| 7–0–2
| Bruno Queroy
| Decision (unanimous)
| Shooto: To The Top 8
| 
| align=center| 2
| align=center| 5:00
| Tokyo, Japan
| 
|-
| Win
| align=center| 6–0–2
| Takaharu Murahama
| Technical Decision (unanimous)
| Shooto: GIG East 4
| 
| align=center| 2
| align=center| 2:45
| Tokyo, Japan
| 
|-
| Win
| align=center| 5–0–2
| Charlie Pearson
| Decision (majority)
| Shooto: To The Top 5
| 
| align=center| 2
| align=center| 5:00
| Tokyo, Japan
| 
|-
| Win
| align=center| 4–0–2
| Ian James Schaffa
| Decision (unanimous)
| Shooto: To The Top 3
| 
| align=center| 2
| align=center| 5:00
| Tokyo, Japan
| 
|-
| Win
| align=center| 3–0–2
| Chikara Miyake
| Decision (unanimous)
| Shooto: GIG West 1
| 
| align=center| 2
| align=center| 5:00
| Osaka, Japan
| 
|-
| Draw
| align=center| 2–0–2
| Yohei Nanbu
| Draw
| Shooto: R.E.A.D. 12
| 
| align=center| 2
| align=center| 5:00
| Tokyo, Japan
| 
|-
| Win
| align=center| 2–0–1
| Takuhito Hida
| Decision (majority)
| Shooto: R.E.A.D. 10
| 
| align=center| 2
| align=center| 5:00
| Tokyo, Japan
| 
|-
| Draw
| align=center| 1–0–1
| Koji Takeuchi
| Draw
| Shooto: R.E.A.D. 6
| 
| align=center| 2
| align=center| 5:00
| Tokyo, Japan
| 
|-
| Win
| align=center| 1–0
| Tatsuya Kawajiri
| Submission (rear-naked choke)
| Shooto" R.E.A.D. 4
| 
| align=center| 1
| align=center| 2:44
| Tokyo, Japan
|

See also
 List of current mixed martial arts champions
 List of male mixed martial artists

References

External links
Paraestra Osaka(in Japanese)

1973 births
Living people
Japanese male mixed martial artists
Lightweight mixed martial artists
Mixed martial artists utilizing judo
Mixed martial artists utilizing Brazilian jiu-jitsu
Japanese practitioners of Brazilian jiu-jitsu
People awarded a black belt in Brazilian jiu-jitsu
Japanese male judoka
Sportspeople from Osaka